Just You and Me is the second solo studio album released by Adie on 9 March 2010.

Track listing

References

2010 albums
BEC Recordings albums